Betxí is a municipality in the comarca of Plana Baixa in the province of Castellón (Valencian Community), Spain.

It is famous by its international Rock Music Festival Sant Antoni Pop Festival

See also
List of municipalities in Castelló
Roman Catholic Diocese of Teruel and Albarracín
Roman Catholic Diocese of Tortosa

References

External links 

 Pàgina de l'ajuntament
 País Valencià, poble a poble, comarca a comarca, de Paco González Ramírez, d'on se n'ha tret informació amb el seu consentiment.
 Institut Valencià d'Estadística.
 Portal de la Direcció General d'Administració Local de la Generalitat.

Municipalities in the Province of Castellón
Plana Baixa
Valencian Community